"The Bringers of Wonder, Part Two" is the eighteenth episode of the second series of Space: 1999 (and the forty-second overall episode of the programme).  The screenplay was written by Terence Feely; the director was Tom Clegg.  The final shooting script is dated 23 June 1976.  Live-action filming took place Wednesday 25 August 1976 through Tuesday 28 September 1976 (with a two-day interruption from 21 to 22 September to film additional scenes for "The Beta Cloud").  A day of second-unit filming was completed on Tuesday 30 November 1976.  This was the series' only two-part episode.

Story 
It is 1915 days after leaving Earth orbit, and Moonbase Alpha is in the midst of a celebration.  A rescue party from Earth travelling in a Superswift, an interstellar vessel equipped with a faster-than-light drive system, has arrived on the Moon.  The Alpha castaways can now return home after more than five years of mad travel through a hostile universe.  At this time, a team of Alphans—Alan Carter with nuclear physicists Jack Bartlett and Joe Ehrlich—have travelled uncountable light-years and are approaching Earth in the Superswift's compact pilot ship.

This is how events appear to the Alpha population.  In reality, they are under the mental control of hostile aliens, who appear to the humans as family and friends comprising the crew of Superswift.  The only person who can see them as they actually are is John Koenig.  Three days previously while flying a reconnaissance mission, the Commander seemed to lose control of himself and, in his demented state, crashed in the vicinity of the nuclear-waste domes.

With severe concussion, Koenig was given treatment with an Ellendorf quadrographic brain complex, an experimental machine designed to electronically treat neurological trauma.  On regaining consciousness, he was introduced to the 'Earth visitors' and—now immune to their mind control—saw the aliens for what they were and reacted violently to their invasion of Alpha.  Unable to see the aliens as anything but friends, his own staff believed him to be unbalanced, sedated him, and placed him in restraints in the Medical Centre.

In reality, Koenig had been controlled by the aliens with the intent of eliminating him in the Eagle Transporter crash.  Having failed, they made another attempt on his life:  Sandstrom, an orderly, was controlled and tried to kill him by corrupting the settings of the brain complex.  This was thwarted by the quick action of Doctor Ben Vincent.  The aliens successfully disposed of Clive Kander after the records clerk reviewed his video coverage and saw the aliens in their true form on the recording.  Under their control, Kander destroyed his office (and the evidence) in an act of violent dementia in which he was killed.

As the staff listens to the gleeful reports from the pilot-ship crew, an alien (who the Alphans see as 'Doctor Shaw', Helena Russell's medical-school tutor) enters the care unit with the mission to kill Koenig once and for all.  A seven-foot-tall, slime-covered heap of putrefying protoplasm slithers across the floor on its tentacles.  Approaching the helpless Koenig, it collapses atop him and proceeds to crush the life out of him.  As he loses consciousness, this latest murder attempt, too, is foiled when Helena and Maya enter.

After 'Shaw' exits, the women wake Koenig and attempt to reason with him.  They show him footage of the pilot ship in flight; he responds that he sees an Eagle.  He then asks Maya if she, too, sees the visitors as Earth people.  Her answer disappoints him; he had hoped her different brain structure would give her the ability to resist the aliens' telepathic control.  She cites the fact that if he is correct then, by his reckoning, every other person on Alpha is wrong.  He speculates that, as the only person to have been treated with the Ellendorf apparatus, his perception could be protected, not distorted.

Removed from direct contact with the aliens (and not prejudiced by the desire to return to Earth), Maya penetrates the mind control.  She realises it is impossible that every member of the Earth crew is known to someone on Alpha.  If Koenig is right, they obtained their disguises from the Alphans' memories and are projecting them into everyone's consciousness.  Helena recounts a conversation with Vincent; he was aware of Koenig's plight during Sandstrom's murder attempt, but it did not register until his fiancée 'Louisa' was distracted.  Maya herself witnessed Tony Verdeschi's drawing of names for the pilot-ship crew, which occurred under the close scrutiny of his older brother, 'Guido'.

Koenig then brings up an undeniable fact—they have been travelling in space for over five years; with the time-dilation effect, this equates to the passage of centuries on Earth.  All their friends and family should be long dead.  Maya is aghast to have not considered this; Koenig replies the aliens would not let her.  To test his theory, she agrees to a session with the brain complex.  During this, Carter, Bartlett and Ehrlich happily believe the pilot ship has arrived at Earth and has landed at the New York City spaceport.  In reality, their Eagle touches down in close proximity to the nuclear-waste domes.  They disembark, wrapped in the illusion of a triumphant homecoming, while manipulated telepathically to carry out the aliens' sinister tasks.

Maya completes the treatment; looking out into the corridor, she is disgusted to see 'Shaw' and Sandra Benes' fiancé 'Peter Rockwell' as they truly appear.  To learn the aliens' motives, she transforms into one.  Locating several of the jelloid aliens conversing, the metamorph hovers at the edge of the group and eavesdrops.  They soon recognise her as a stranger and pursue her.  The Maya/Jelloid rounds a corner and (with some difficulty) reverts to normal form, smiling politely at the repugnant beings as she walks past them.

Returning to Medical, she relates the facts she uncovered.  The jelloids are a species that assimilate radiation for sustenance.  The ambient radioactivity of their world has been exhausted and they are searching for a new source.  On the brink of starvation, the aliens have found the Moon and want the accumulated atomic waste.  Koenig would be happy giving them the deadly substance, but Maya reveals they require the intense radiation that would be released by detonating the waste dumps.  The aliens consider the Alphans inconsequential life-forms and have no qualms about killing them.  As they possess little kinetic energy, they must deceive the Alphans via illusion into performing the act themselves.

Koenig accesses cameras at the nuclear-waste domes and finds the Eagle there.  Atomic fuel will be needed to catalyse the reaction; he switches cameras to the atomic fuel storage facility and finds Carter and Erhlich already there to procure the deadly container.  A command order is issued to Computer, sealing the door and locking the two men inside.  He then tries to commandeer an Eagle to stop the three deluded pawns.  He is stopped at the launch pad by Verdeschi and his Security guards, who are made to see him as a dangerous madman.

The security chief confines Koenig to Medical Centre under guard.  Maya takes out the guard with a stun-gun blast and she, Koenig and Helena plot to render the entire Alpha population immune to the aliens' control.  It would be impossible to treat them all with the Ellendorf process.  Helena suggests the use of 'white noise', a sonic anaesthetic  she uses when drugs are contraindicated; it effectively blocks nerve paths and synapses in the brain.  Maya figures it will block the telepathic input of the aliens if broadcast over the public-address system.

They make their way to Command Centre, evading the Security forces bent on killing them, and play the white noise recording.  It works as expected, and pandemonium erupts when the staff sees the true identity of their friends and loved ones.  Amid the chaos, the aliens suddenly vanish.  Koenig knows this is no victory and calls up a picture of the atomic fuel store, where Carter and Ehrlich have cut through the door's lock with a thermal lance.  Still under alien control, the two men proceed by moon buggy to the waste domes with the fuel core.  Koenig takes Maya and Verdeschi with him in Eagle Five to stop them.  Meanwhile, at the waste-dome monitoring depot, Bartlett primes the domes for detonation.

While searching for the moon buggy, Maya reckons the starved aliens are now focusing their waning power on the three men.  She guesses they are deriving sustenance from the cumulative minute emissions of radiation from all the electrical equipment on Alpha.  Koenig orders all non-essential systems powered down.  When they sight the moon buggy, Koenig is lowered down by a harness (as the surface terrain is too unstable to support the Eagle) to intercept them.  Believing they are driving through the country with two luscious girls, Carter and Ehrlich see Koenig as a ski-mask-clad maniac.  They assault him, disconnecting the tube from his oxygen tank.

Maya comes to his rescue in the form of a space animal which can exist in a vacuum.  In the mêlée, Ehrlich's spacesuit is breached and he must be taken to Moonbase for medical attention.  Carter takes off in the moon buggy and Koenig pursues on foot.  Carter arrives at the monitoring depot and welds the airlock door shut.  He and Bartlett then proceed through the dome's interior to the core access hatch.  Not having the security codes to open the massive lead hatch, they use the thermal lance to cut into its locking mechanism.

Outside, Koenig arrives, makes his way through a throng of jelloids, and discovers the sealed door.  Using the moon buggy as a battering ram, he drives into the door repeatedly and breaks the weld.  He wonders how the aliens are still active.  Maya surmises that, as the functioning human brain produces electrical energy, they must be drawing on these emissions to keep going at survival level.  To reduce this energy source, Koenig orders Helena to render the entire staff unconscious, excluding herself and the chief engineer.  Donning a gas mask, the doctor releases anaesthetic gas into the ventilation system.

At the waste domes, Koenig finds Carter and Bartlett opening the access hatch to the waste storage chamber. He tackles Carter as the astronaut hoists the fuel core into the port. As Bartlett takes the core, he is suddenly free of the jelloids' control and tosses it away in horror. Koenig explains the situation to the bewildered man as he himself restrains the struggling Carter. The alien leader speaks, admitting to Bartlett he has been living an illusion. It asks him was he not happier in this illusion, reunited with his wife and little daughter on Earth, than with the reality of being trapped on the wandering Moon? They can provide a lifetime of joy in an instant of time; would that not be preferable to a miserable existence and death in space?

Bartlett is immobilised by this seductive spiel when Carter breaks free, overwhelms Koenig and actually inserts the fuel core into the access port. Koenig rallies, knocks him out with a right cross and pulls the core out before it is pushed down the chute into the waste mass. The jelloid leader scornfully tells Koenig what a primitive organism he is, throwing away the eternity of happiness they could have experienced in those seconds before dying. He has condemned his people to a cruel and futile existence. As the aliens dissolve into nothingness, Koenig rebuts, 'It is better to live as your own man than as a fool in someone else's dream.'

Returning to Alpha, Koenig and company witness the dissolution of the alien ship. The Commander good-naturedly grouses about running the base with his unconscious staff of 'sleeping beauties' just before the events of the last three days catch up with him and he, too, is slumbering in his chair...

Cast

Starring 
 Martin Landau — Commander John Koenig
 Barbara Bain — Doctor Helena Russell

Also starring 
 Catherine Schell — Maya

Featuring 
 Tony Anholt — Tony Verdeschi
 Nick Tate — Captain Alan Carter
 Zienia Merton — Sandra Benes
 Jeffery Kissoon — Doctor Ben Vincent

Guest stars 
 Toby Robins — Diana Morris
 Stuart Damon — Captain Guido Verdeschi
 Jeremy Young — Jack Bartlett
 Drewe Henley — Joe Ehrlich
 Patrick Westwood — Doctor Shaw
 Cher Cameron — Louisa

Also featuring 
 Al Lampert — Ken Burdett
 Billy J. Mitchell — Professor Hunter
 Nicholas Young — Peter Rockwell

Uncredited artists 
 Robert Reeves — Peter
 Jenny Cresswell — Command Centre Operative
 David Jackson — Alien Voice

Music 
The score was re-edited from previous Space: 1999 incidental music tracks composed for the second series by Derek Wadsworth and draws primarily from the scores of "The Metamorph", "The Taybor" and "Space Warp".  A movement of Beethoven's 'Symphony No. 5 in C minor' is heard during Bartlett's illusion of listening to the piece on his hi-fi system, while in reality he was preparing the waste domes for detonation.

Production notes 
 Attentive viewers will note that there were only three alien "jellies" (as they were known in the script) constructed for the production; for crowd scenes, life-sized photographic cut-outs were employed.  Cast from latex, the costumes were painted with grease for the slime effect and had artificial blood pumping through fine transparent tubing.  Actor David Jackson, who had appeared earlier this series under considerable latex appliances as 'Alien Strong' in "The Rules of Luton", was relieved that there was no special make-up for this role.  He read his lines from off-screen while a stuntman sweated under what he recalls as an unwieldy latex "teepee". Jackson would gain fame in 1978 for his portrayal of Olag Gan in the Terry Nation science-fiction series Blake's 7.
 In the broadcast version of this episode, Helena's status report used to re-cap the previous episode mentioned the date as "2515 days" after leaving orbit; the shooting script clearly has the date typed correctly as "1915 days".  It has been speculated that actress Barbara Bain simply misread or misspoke the line; however, when viewing the compilation movie Destination: Moonbase Alpha released by ITC London in 1978, the line in question is spoken by Bain as "1915 days" (for continuity sake, the "correct" 1915-day notation was used for this synopsis).
 Many publicity shots of Nick Tate and the unidentified actress playing his illusory companion were taken in the Pinewood Studios gardens and surrounding grounds during the shooting of their scenes.

Novelisation 
The episode was adapted in the fourth Year Two Space: 1999 novel The Psychomorph by Michael Butterworth published in 1977.  The author would make the jelly aliens the psychically-synthesised minions of a massive non-corporeal space amoeba (which was also the unseen antagonist in the previous segment "The Lambda Factor").  The sentient amoeba was dying and required a massive influx of radiation to rejuvenate itself.  It would manipulate the Alphans with the lambda-wave effect to provide the explosion that would be its salvation.

In the 2003 novel The Forsaken written by John Kenneth Muir, it is stated the events of this story were one of the consequences of the death of the eponymous intelligence depicted in "Space Brain".  The Brain provided the radiation required for the jelloid aliens' survival; after its death, the jelloid beings would being searching for alternate sources of sustenance.

References

External links 
Space: 1999 - "The Bringers of Wonder, Part Two" - The Catacombs episode guide
Space: 1999 - "The Bringers of Wonder, Part Two" - Moonbase Alpha's Space: 1999 page

1977 British television episodes
Space: 1999 episodes